Apachita (Aymara for the place of transit of an important pass in the principal routes of the Andes; name for a stone cairn in the Andes, a little pile of rocks built along the trail in the high mountains, Hispanicized spelling Apacheta) is a   mountain in the Chilla-Kimsa Chata mountain range in the Andes of Bolivia. It lies in the La Paz Department, Ingavi Province, Jesús de Machaca Municipality, north-east of Ch'ama (Chama). Apachita is situated south-west of the mountain Ch'utu Wankarani and north-east of the mountain Imill Wawani.

References 

Mountains of La Paz Department (Bolivia)